Deiyandara National College is one of the oldest school in Matara District, Sri Lanka.

National schools in Sri Lanka
Schools in Matara District